The 1972 Women's World Chess Championship was won by Nona Gaprindashvili, who successfully defended her title against challenger Alla Kushnir. This was the third (and last) consecutive title match between the two strongest female players of their time.

1971 Interzonal Tournament

For the first time, the women's championship cycle consisted of all the same stages as the open cycle. An Interzonal tournament was held in Ohrid in May 1971, featuring the best players from each FIDE zone, for a total of 18 participants. The top three would qualify for the Candidates Tournament.

{| class="wikitable"
|+ 1971 Women's Interzonal Tournament
|-
! !! Player !! 1 !! 2 !! 3 !! 4 !! 5 !! 6 !! 7 !! 8 !! 9 !! 10 !! 11 !! 12 !! 13 !! 14 !! 15 !! 16 !! 17 !! 18 !! Points !! Tie break
|- style="background:#cfc;"
| 1 ||  || - || 0 || ½ || 1 || 1 || ½ || ½ || 1 || ½ || 0 || 1 || 1 || 1 || 1 || 1 || 1 || 1 || 1 || 13 || 
|- style="background:#cfc;"
| 2 ||  || 1 || - || 0 || ½ || 0 || 1 || 0 || ½ || 1 || 1 || ½ || 1 || 1 || ½ || 1 || 1 || 1 || 1 || 12 || 91.75
|- style="background:#cfc;"
| 3 ||  || ½ || 1 || - || 0 || ½ || ½ || ½ || ½ || ½ || ½ || 1 || 1 || ½ || 1 || 1 || 1 || 1 || 1 || 12 || 91.25
|-
| 4 ||  || 0 || ½ || 1 || - || 1 || ½ || 1 || 0 || ½ || 1 || 0 || ½ || 1 || 1 || 1 || ½ || ½ || 1 || 11 || 87.50
|-
| 5 ||  || 0 || 1 || ½ || 0 || - || ½ || ½ || 1 || ½ || 0 || 1 || ½ || ½ || 1 || 1 || 1 || 1 || 1 || 11 || 82.00
|-
| 6 ||  || ½ || 0 || ½ || ½ || ½ || - || ½ || ½ || 1 || 1 || ½ || 1 || 1 || 1 || ½ || 0 || 1 || ½ || 10½ || 
|-
| 7 ||  || ½ || 1 || ½ || 0 || ½ || ½ || - || ½ || 1 || ½ || 0 || ½ || ½ || ½ || 0 || 1 || 1 || 1 || 9½ || 77.50
|-
| 8 ||  || 0 || ½ || ½ || 1 || 0 || ½ || ½ || - || ½ || 1 || 1 || ½ || ½ || ½ || ½ || ½ || ½ || 1 || 9½ || 75.50
|-
| 9 ||  || ½ || 0 || ½ || ½ || ½ || 0 || 0 || ½ || - || 1 || ½ || 1 || ½ || ½ || 1 || 1 || ½ || ½ || 9 || 
|-
| 10 ||  || 1 || 0 || ½ || 0 || 1 || 0 || ½ || 0 || 0 || - || 1 || 0 || 1 || ½ || 0 || 1 || 1 || 1 || 8½ || 
|-
| 11 ||  || 0 || ½ || 0 || 1 || 0 || ½ || 1 || 0 || ½ || 0 || - || ½ || ½ || 1 || 1 || ½ || ½ || 0 || 7½ || 59.25
|-
| 12 ||  || 0 || 0 || 0 || ½ || ½ || 0 || ½ || ½ || 0 || 1 || ½ || - || ½ || ½ || 1 || 1 || ½ || ½ || 7½ || 54.00
|-
| 13 ||  || 0 || 0 || ½ || 0 || ½ || 0 || ½ || ½ || ½ || 0 || ½ || ½ || - || ½ || ½ || 1 || ½ || ½ || 6½ || 
|-
| 14 ||  || 0 || ½ || 0 || 0 || 0 || 0 || ½ || ½ || ½ || ½ || 0 || ½ || ½ || - || 1 || ½ || 0 || ½ || 5½ || 41.50
|-
| 15 ||  || 0 || 0 || 0 || 0 || 0 || ½ || 1 || ½ || 0 || 1 || 0 || 0 || ½ || 0 || - || ½ || ½ || 1 || 5½ || 40.75
|-
| 16 ||  || 0 || 0 || 0 || ½ || 0 || 1 || 0 || ½ || 0 || 0 || ½ || 0 || 0 || ½ || ½ || - || ½ || 1 || 5 || 37.00
|-
| 17 ||  || 0 || 0 || 0 || ½ || 0 || 0 || 0 || ½ || ½ || 0 || ½ || ½ || ½ || 1 || ½ || ½ || - || 0 || 5 || 36.25
|-
| 18 ||  || 0 || 0 || 0 || 0 || 0 || ½ || 0 || 0 || ½ || 0 || 1 || ½ || ½ || ½ || 0 || 0 || 1 || - || 4½ || 
|}

1971 Candidates matches

The top three from the Interzonal were joined by Kushnir, the loser of the last championship match. These four players contested a knock-out series of matches to determine the challenger. Kushnir again prevailed, earning the right to another shot at Gaprindashvili's title.

1972 Championship Match

The championship match was played in Riga in 1972. This time, Kushnir came closer than ever to beating Gaprindashvili, but with draws in the last two games the defending champion managed to hang onto her title by one point.

{| class="wikitable" style="text-align:center"
|+Women's World Championship Match 1972
|-
! !! 1 !! 2 !! 3 !! 4 !! 5 !! 6 !! 7 !! 8 !! 9 !! 10 !! 11 !! 12 !! 13 !! 14 !! 15 !! 16 !! Total
|-
| align=left | 
| 1 ||style="background:black; color:white"| 1 || 0 ||style="background:black; color:white"| 1 || ½ ||style="background:black; color:white"| 1 || ½ ||style="background:black; color:white"| 0 || 1 ||style="background:black; color:white"| ½ || 0 ||style="background:black; color:white"| ½ || ½ ||style="background:black; color:white"| 0 || ½ ||style="background:black; color:white"| ½ || 8½
|-
| align=left | 
|style="background:black; color:white"| 0 || 0 ||style="background:black; color:white"| 1 || 0 ||style="background:black; color:white"| ½ || 0 ||style="background:black; color:white"| ½ || 1 ||style="background:black; color:white"| 0 || ½ ||style="background:black; color:white"| 1 || ½ ||style="background:black; color:white"| ½ || 1 ||style="background:black; color:white"| ½ || ½ || 7½
|}

References

Women's World Chess Championships
1972 in chess